The Path of Freedom Party is a political party in Albania, led by Shukrane Muda.

References 

Political parties in Albania